The Panhsin Twin Towers is a skyscraper in Banqiao District, New Taipei, Taiwan. It is the sixth tallest building in Taiwan and the tallest in New Taipei City. The height of building is 180 m, the floor area is 100,670.03m2, and it comprises 34 floors (Tower A) and 32 floors (Tower B) above ground, as well as 7 basement levels. Panhsin Twin Towers is the seat of headquarter of Bank Of Panshin (:zh:板信商業銀行).

See also 
 List of tallest buildings in Taiwan

References

2009 establishments in Taiwan
Office buildings completed in 2009
Skyscraper office buildings in New Taipei
Twin towers
Bank headquarters in Taiwan